Rudolf Karel Hollaender (born 24 November 1968) is a Dutch former professional footballer.

Career statistics

Club

Notes

References

External links
 Yau Yee Football League profile
 

Living people
1968 births
Dutch footballers
Association football goalkeepers
Hong Kong First Division League players
Hong Kong Premier League players
Hong Kong FC players
Dutch expatriate footballers
Dutch expatriate sportspeople in Hong Kong
Expatriate footballers in Hong Kong